City Railway Station metro station may refer to:

 City Railway Station metro station (Bangalore)
 City Railway Station metro station (Lucknow)
 Chengzhan station (literally "City Railway Station station") in Hangzhou